KAGA-LP (106.9 FM) is a low-power FM radio station licensed to San Angelo, Texas, United States. The station is currently owned by Calvary Chapel San Angelo.

References

External links
 

AGA-LP
AGA-LP
Radio stations established in 2008
2008 establishments in Texas
Calvary Chapel Association
Radio stations in San Angelo, Texas